The 2015–16 Österreichische Basketball Bundesliga season, for sponsorships reasons named the Admiral Basketball Bundesliga, was the 70th season of the first tier of basketball in Austria.

Teams

Managerial changes

Standings

Playoffs

Austrian clubs in international competitions

References

Österreichische Basketball Bundesliga seasons
Austrian
Lea